"A Million to One" is a song written by Phil Medley and first recorded by Jimmy Charles and the Revellettes.

Chart history
The single, released by Promo Records (P-1002), peaked at number five on the U.S. Billboard Hot 100 singles chart.

Covers
"A Million to One" has been covered by many artists and some versions appeared on the Billboard Hot 100 (peak positions indicated below).

 Patti Austin (1967)
 Five Stairsteps (1968) – No. 68
 Brian Hyland (1969) – No. 90
 The Manhattans (1972) - No. 114
 Donny Osmond (1973) – No. 23
 Jermaine Jackson (1973)
 J. R. Bailey (1977)
 Selena (1986)
 New Edition (1986)

References

1960 songs
1960 singles
1968 singles
1969 singles
1972 singles
1973 singles
Five Stairsteps songs
Brian Hyland songs
The Manhattans songs
Donny Osmond songs
Songs written by Phil Medley
MGM Records singles